Élie-Oscar Bertrand (March 3, 1894 – October 21, 1980) was a businessman and political figure in Ontario, Canada. Bertrand represented Prescott in the House of Commons of Canada as a Liberal member from 1929 to 1949.

He was born in L'Orignal, Ontario in 1894, the son of Louis Bertrand. He married Armande Scott in 1915. He was a merchant at L'Original and served as clerk for the municipal council and was mayor from 1922 to 1929. Bertrand was first elected to the House of Commons in a 1929 by-election held after Louis-Mathias Auger resigned his seat. He held the Prescott seat until he was defeated in 1949 by Raymond Bruneau. Shortly afterwards, Bertrand was named to the Canadian Farm Loan Board, a predecessor to Farm Credit Canada, and served until 1960.

References 
 Histoire des Comtes Unis de Prescott et de Russell, L. Brault (1963)

External links 
 

1894 births
1980 deaths
Liberal Party of Canada MPs
Members of the House of Commons of Canada from Ontario
Mayors of places in Ontario
Franco-Ontarian people